Raoul Lamourdedieu (2 February 1877 – 8 May 1953) was a French sculptor, and medallist. His work was part of the sculpture event in the art competition at the 1924 Summer Olympics.

References

1877 births
1953 deaths
19th-century French sculptors
20th-century French sculptors
French male sculptors
Olympic competitors in art competitions
People from Lot-et-Garonne
19th-century French male artists